Economic Forum may refer to:

Economic Forum (in Poland)
Ghana Economic Forum
World Economic Forum, Davos, Switzerland